Reverend Willem Konjore (30 July 1945—10 June 2021) was a Namibian politician. He was a member and a deputy speaker of the National Assembly of Namibia, and served in cabinet from 2005 to 2010.

Early life and education
Konjore was born on 30 July 1945 in Kais, a small settlement in what today is the ǁKaras Region. He trained as a teacher from 1966 to 1967 at St Joseph's Teacher Training Centre in Döbra and studied theology in the Diocese of Keetmanshoop and Mariental from 1976 to 1979. From 1968 to 1990 he worked at several schools, first as teacher in Tses in southern Namibia and later as principal and manager in Khorixas.

Political career
A member of SWAPO, Konjore was a member of the National Assembly of Namibia beginning with the Constituent Assembly in 1989 and ending following the election of the 5th National Assembly in 2010. He served as deputy speaker of this body from 2000 to 2005.

He was appointed Minister of Environment and Tourism in 2005, and was moved to the Youth, National Service, Sport and Culture portfolio in 2008.

Konjore was married to Elsie Atanasia Konjore from Vaalgras. They had five children. His wife died in 2013. On Heroes' Day 2014 he was conferred the Most Brilliant Order of the Sun, Second Class. Willem Konjore died on 10 June 2021 in Windhoek.

References

1945 births
2021 deaths
People from ǁKaras Region
Members of the National Assembly (Namibia)
Namibian educators
Namibian clergy
SWAPO politicians
Environment and tourism ministers of Namibia
Youth ministers of Namibia
Sports ministers of Namibia
Culture ministers of Namibia